Mount Zion Church is a historic church in Mt. Zion Hollow in Decatur, Tennessee, United States.

It is a rectangular frame building that was built in 1850. It was added to the National Register of Historic Places in 1982 as the "best preserved" and "least altered" of the simple rural church structures found in a survey of historic buildings in Meigs County.

References

External links
 Cemeteries: Mt. Zion, knaepen.homestead.com

Churches in Tennessee
Churches on the National Register of Historic Places in Tennessee
Churches completed in 1850
19th-century churches in the United States
Buildings and structures in Meigs County, Tennessee
National Register of Historic Places in Meigs County, Tennessee